Draposa atropalpis is a species of spiders of the genus Draposa. It is native to India and Sri Lanka.

See also
 List of Lycosidae species

References

Spiders described in 1924
Lycosidae
Spiders of Asia